Buscombe is a surname. Notable people with the surname include:

Frederick Buscombe (1862–1938), Canadian mayor
Lisa Buscombe, Canadian archer
Peta Buscombe, Baroness Buscombe (born 1954), English barrister and politician
Ruth Buscombe, British Formula One strategy engineer

See also
Buscombe Lake, a lake of Nova Scotia, Canada